Archer Holz (born in Australia) is an Australian rugby union player who plays for the  in Super Rugby. His playing position is prop. He was named in the Brumbies squad for the 2021 Super Rugby AU season.

Early life 
Holz grew up in Lighting Ridge before attending The King's School, Parramatta where he played in the 1st XV.

Reference list

External links
itsrugby.co.uk profile

Australian rugby union players
Living people
Rugby union props
Year of birth missing (living people)
ACT Brumbies players
New South Wales Waratahs players